Alessandro de' Medici (1560–1606) was an Italian patrician, belonging to Neapolitan branch of House of Medici.

Biography 
A member of a cadet branch of the Medici family (the one later called the Princes of Ottajano), he was the son of Bernadetto de' Medici and Giulia de' Medici.

He was General of the Papal States.

His son was Ottaviano de' Medici, 1st Prince of Ottajano .

Alessandro
16th-century Italian nobility
16th-century births
17th-century deaths
16th-century Neapolitan people
1560 births
1606 deaths